Rashmi Gautam is an Indian actress and television presenter who appears in Telugu-language films and TV. She hosts the Telugu television comedy show Extra Jabardasth and is a conceptual team leader in reality dance show Dhee.

Early life and career 
Gautam was born in a Brahmin family of Visakhapatnam, Andhra Pradesh to an Odia-speaking mother, and a father from Uttar Pradesh.

After appearing in a supporting role in the Telugu 2010 film, Prasthanam, Gautam was spotted by actress Sangeetha at a reality dance show and she referred her to Mugil, who subsequently signed her on to play the lead role of Narmada in the 2011 Tamil Film Kandaen. She also starred in the Kannada film Guru

 Filmography 
FilmsAll films are in Telugu unless otherwise noted.''

Television

References

External links 
 
 

Actresses in Tamil cinema
Actresses in Telugu cinema
Indian film actresses
Indian television actresses
Indian women television presenters
Indian television presenters
Actresses from Visakhapatnam
Actresses in Telugu television
21st-century Indian actresses
Telugu television anchors
Living people
Year of birth missing (living people)